

The Sports Network Poll

The Coaches Poll

Preseason polls
Various publications release their preseason top 25 months before the season commences.

References

Rankings
NCAA Division I FCS football rankings